Belle Isle is a historic plantation house located near Lancaster, Lancaster County, Virginia.  It was built about 1759, and consists of a two-story, three bay, brick central section with one-story flanking wings.  The Colonial style dwelling has a hipped roof pierced by two tall interior end chimneys, and surrounded at its base by the original modillion cornice.  Also on the property are two original one-story brick dependencies set perpendicular to the facade of the house.  The original interior woodwork was removed in 1922, and installed in the Winterthur Museum in 1941.

It was listed on the National Register of Historic Places in 1987.

References

External links
Belle Isle, State Route 683, Somers, Lancaster County, VA: 24 photos, 18 measured drawings, and 2 data pages at Historic American Buildings Survey

Historic American Buildings Survey in Virginia
Plantation houses in Virginia
Houses on the National Register of Historic Places in Virginia
Colonial architecture in Virginia
Houses completed in 1759
Houses in Lancaster County, Virginia
National Register of Historic Places in Lancaster County, Virginia
1759 establishments in Virginia